Maury County Airport  is a county-owned public-use airport in Maury County, Tennessee, United States.

This airport is included in the National Plan of Integrated Airport Systems for 2011–2015, which categorized it as a general aviation airport.

Facilities and aircraft 
Maury County Airport covers an area of 188 acres (76 ha) at an elevation of 681 feet (208 m) above mean sea level. It has two runways: 6/24 is 6,000 by 100 feet (1,829 x 30 m) with an asphalt pavement and 17/35 is 1,811 by 150 feet (552 x 46 m) with a turf surface.

For the 12-month period ending June 29, 2010, the airport had 28,900 aircraft operations, an average of 79 per day: 78% general aviation, 19% air taxi, and 3% military. At that time there were 23 aircraft based at this airport: 65% single-engine, 26% multi-engine, 4% jet, and 4% helicopter.

References

External links 
 Aerial image as of February 1999 from USGS The National Map
 
 

Airports in Tennessee
Buildings and structures in Maury County, Tennessee
Transportation in Maury County, Tennessee